Azteca bequaerti is a species of ant in the genus Azteca. Described by  Wheeler & Bequaert in 1929, the species is endemic to Brazil and Peru.

References

Azteca (genus)
Hymenoptera of North America
Hymenoptera of South America
Insects described in 1929